The INAS World Football Championship is an international association football competition for athletes with intellectual disabilities. It takes place every four years, typically in the country that also hosts the FIFA World Cup. It is organized by the International Sports Federation for Persons with Intellectual Disability (INAS-FID) which also organizes championships in other sports. 

To participate in an INAS-FID event, an athlete must have an intellectual disability that was evident before the age of 18, significant limitations in adaptive behavior, and an IQ score below 75. The latter requirement led to controversy in 2006, when third-placed Germany was disqualified because the employed IQ tests did not accord with international standards.

Winners

References

External links
 
FIFA.com

Paralympic association football
Parasports world championships
World championships in football variants